KFF Bazeli is a women's football club based in Biçec, Kosovo. The club competes in Kosovo Women's Football League which is the top tier of women's football in the country. Their home ground is the Biçec Sports Field which has a viewing capacity of 500.

See also
 List of football clubs in Kosovo

References

Football clubs in Kosovo
Women's football clubs in Kosovo